Wendy Bell Rieger (April 18, 1956 – April 16, 2022) was an American journalist and actress. She was known for her work as an anchor person for WRC-TV.

Rieger is also known for founding Going Green, an online publication.

Rieger received numerous awards during her career, including one Emmy Award for a report on the Vietnam War and an award from Washingtonian magazine.

Early life and career
Born on April 18, 1956, in Norfolk, Virginia, she attended American University and graduated with a bachelor's degree in journalism.

Before joining media, she worked briefly as an actress in Norfolk in the 1970s. Her first job in journalistic career was as a newsreader for a radio station based in Tidewater.

In the 1980s, she worked with various media organizations, including WAMU, WLTT-FM and WTOP.

In 1988, she joined WRC-TV as a nighttime reporter.

In 2008, she received the Washingtonian Green Award for her work on environmental safety and preservation.

Health and Death

In October 2020, Rieger underwent open-heart surgery to repair a faulty mitral valve.

The following April, she began feeling unwell, and was forced to miss the funeral of former colleague Joe Krebs. A month later, she was diagnosed with glioblastoma, which she died from on April 16, 2022, two days before her 66th birthday.

Personal life
Rieger's first marriage was with Sol Levine which ended in divorce. She married again in 2021 with a former NBC4 photographer, Dan Buckley.

References

1956 births
2022 deaths
Actors from Norfolk, Virginia
Emmy Award winners
Journalists from Virginia